Rocky Marciano is a 1999 television film directed by Charles Winkler and presented by MGM. It tells the story of the rise to fame of legendary boxer Rocky Marciano.

Plot

The film shows Rocco's childhood through his fight with his hero Joe Louis.  After the Louis fight it flashes forward to his post career, leading up to his death in a 1969 plane crash.

Cast
Jon Favreau as Rocky Marciano
Penelope Ann Miller as Barbara Cousins
Judd Hirsch as Al Weill
Tony Lo Bianco as Frankie Carbo
Duane Davis as Joe Louis
Rino Romano as Allie Colombo
George C. Scott as Pierino Marchegiano
Rhoda Gemignani as Pasquelina Marchegiano
Aron Tager as Charley Goldman
Noah Danby as Carmine Vingo
Gil Filar as Young Rocky
Jerome Silvano as Young Allie
Carmela Albero as Mrs. Vingo
Conrad Bergschneider as Guard
J. Winston Carroll as Murphy
Jeff Clarke as Brockton Eddie
Lauren Collins as Mary Anne
Natasha Debellis as Rocky's Sister
Reg Dreger as TV Announcer
Richard Fitzpatrick as Commentator
Dean Hagopian as News Reporter
 Peter E.Wylie (Main Referee)
Gavin Heffernan as Boisterous Kid
Howard Jerome as Madison Square Garden Ring Referee
John Kalbhenn as Palisades Referee
Marvin Kaye as Hand Worker
Barry Kennedy as Bomber Jacket Pilot
Christopher Kentebe as Sparring partner
Bill Lake as Pilot
Robert Latimer as TV Producer
Shawn Lawrence as Irish Worker
John Liddle as Wellwisher
Gordon Lusby as Lee Epperson
Christopher Marren as Young Pilot
Gino Marrocco as Wellwisher
Ray Marsh as Announcer Epperson Fight
Kenneth McGregor as Foreman
Gerry Mendicino as Emcee
Sandra Nelson as Screaming Woman
Jack Newman as Doc
James O'Regan as Clerk
Panou as Orderly
Jill Riley as Wellwisher
Wayne Robson as Lou Ambers
David Roemmele as Young Brockton Eddie
Ed Sahely as Announcer

Awards and nominations
Canadian Society  of Cinematographers  Awards
1999: Won, "Best Cinematography in TV Drama"

Motion Picture Sound Editors
2000: Nominated, "Best Sound Editing - Television Movies and Specials - Effects & Foley"

References

External links

1999 films
1999 television films
1990s biographical films
1990s sports films
American biographical films
American boxing films
Canadian biographical films
Biographical films about sportspeople
Cultural depictions of boxers
Cultural depictions of American men
Cultural depictions of Joe Louis
English-language Canadian films
Films scored by Stanley Clarke
Films set in the 20th century
Rocky Marciano
Sports films based on actual events
Films directed by Charles Winkler
1990s American films
1990s Canadian films